Gyfu is the name for the g-rune  in the Anglo-Saxon rune poem, meaning ‘gift’ or ‘generosity’:

The corresponding letter of the Gothic alphabet is 𐌲 g, called giba. The same rune also appears in the Elder Futhark, with a suggested Proto-Germanic name *gebô ‘gift’. J. H. Looijenga speculates that the rune is directly derived from Latin Χ, the pronunciation of which may have been similar to Germanic g in the 1st century, e.g., Gothic *reihs compared to Latin rex (as opposed to the Etruscan alphabet, where /𐌗 had a value of ).

The gyfu rune is sometimes used as a symbol within modern mysticism, particularly amongst those interested in Celtic mythology. It’s described, for example, in the book The Runic Tarot as a representation of the giving-receiving balance in friendships.

Anglo-Saxon gār rune
In addition to gyfu, the Anglo-Saxon futhorc has the gār rune , named after a species of medieval spear. It is attested epigraphically on the Ruthwell Cross, and also appears in  11th-century manuscript tradition. Phonetically, gār represents the /g/ sound. It is a modification of the plain gyfu rune .

Old English ‘gār’ means ‘spear’, but the name of the rune likely echoes the rune names ger, ear, ior: due to palatalization in Old English, the original g rune (i.e., the Gyfu rune ) could express either /j/ or /g/ (see yogh). The ger unambiguously expressed /j/, and the newly introduced gar rune had the purpose of unambiguously expressing /g/.

Gār is the 33rd and final rune in the row as given in Cotton Domitian A.ix.

See also
Armanen runes § Gibor, 19th-century pseudo-runes of which the 18th character’s name is similar to *gebô

References

External links
 The Futhark on www.ancientscripts.com

Runes